Robert "Bob" Kratch  (born January 6, 1966) is a former American football guard in the National Football League (NFL) for the New York Giants and New England Patriots. He played college football at the University of Iowa for the Hawkeyes.

He lives in Watertown, Minnesota with his wife, Kristi, and three children — Colby, 24, Nate, 22, and Mackenzie, 19. His son, Nate, plays basketball at Santa Clara University. His other son, Colby, was a tight end at Toledo University.  He and his family own and operate Mudd Lake Furniture and The Roof In St Bonifacius, Minnesota.

References
https://web.archive.org/web/20111121034048/http://databasefootball.com/players/playerpage.htm?ilkid=KRATCBOB01
http://www.herald-journal.com/archives/2008/stories/kratch.html

1966 births
Living people
American football offensive guards
Iowa Hawkeyes football players
Mahwah High School alumni
New York Giants players
New England Patriots players
People from Mahwah, New Jersey
Players of American football from New Jersey
Sportspeople from Bergen County, New Jersey
Sportspeople from Brooklyn
Players of American football from New York City